DJ Alber Ensso (original name – Albert Kurshudyan) better known by his stage name DJ Ocean (All-Bert), is an Armenian DJ and producer.

Career 
He started his music classes at 10. Aged 12 he started practicing Logic Pro, the digital audio workstation and MIDI sequencer software application, making his first steps in producing music. In 2014 Albert successfully graduated from Alexander Hekimyan Music School. At 19 he started his solo work, becoming one of the most prominent icons on the Armenian electronic scene.

DJ Alber Ensso presented his first single, Easter Rhapsody, to the public on April 22, 2019 during a joint live show with Robert Babicz, at the largest pavilion of Armenfilm movie studio in Yerevan, Armenia.

Alber Ensso says: “A DJ’s credo is to create good music, and each single is simply their business card to ensure the next one happens.” The musical genres that have influenced him the most are Organic House, Progressive House, Melodic house and Techno. His musical style today is Organic House, Afro house and in fact he tried many other genres too, until he found his style. He says: “From the past there are many differences from now as I evolved into my natural style and found my own wave. I came from Armenia where I lived 21 years and it did influence on my style, because it does bring a new sense into the music for example popular music instruments in Armenia like Duduk or Qanon”.

Stage name 
His initial stage name highlights the special bond he developed with the ocean, and the endlessly romantic worldview his music reflects.

To avoid confusion with other DJ Oceans, it was decided to expand the stage name, and in 2019 a special poll was initiated on Facebook to change his stage name, and of the twelve options, about 20,000 followers opted for DJ Alber Ensso.

Live performance with DJ Babicz 

The live show in iconic Soviet-era film studio Armenfilm on April 22, 2019 was named a "discovery" by local media. The event starred DJ Robert Babicz and DJ Alber Ensso, who invited Babicz from Germany to run a joint show. The huge platform was mentioned not able to involve all the masses, who wanted to join.

"The audience was really cut off from everything. Feeling was that you are in a good European club where people come in for good sound and amazing light effects. And most importantly, in a great environment where you feel yourself relaxed. Regardless of your music preferences, you spend terrific time through a morning with strangers who turn out to be your soulmates, enjoying together fresh sounds, bits and vibrations", Armenian media reported of the event.

"The main goal of the organizers of this mega event is to make Armenia one of the major electronic music centers.  We want to engage the greatest of the musicians into our initiative", DJ Alber Ensso, author of the event, told NEWS.am STYLE.

Aragats mountain record 
On July 11, 2019 for about two hours DJ Alber Ensso's mix of progressive house, melodic techno and underground was resounding on the mountain Aragats, at the altitude of 3,153 meters. He thus became the first DJ in Armenia to successfully mix these styles into an invigorating and unique sound. The performance was registered in "the Book of heroes" – the Armenian analogue of the Guinness Book of Records.

Vartan Tovmasyan, the President of the "Association of Heroes", who was present at the event notes: 
“This was quite a challenge DJ Alber Ensso successfully mastered. You have to deal with sound, pressure and breathing. In addition to the pressure fluctuations at such an elevation, which is a serious problem by itself, there is also the problem of ensuring a good music sound.  The music becomes almost ‘uncontrollable’ in the strong wind and open air: the sound comes and goes with the wind, which causes serious mixing problems. DJ Alber Ensso did a masterful work!"

Personal life 
Alber Ensso was born in Armenia on May 30, 1999, and grew up in the capital Yerevan. He obtained his bachelor's degree in sociology from the Yerevan State University in 2022.

Alber has been practicing karate for thirteen years. He took a bronze in Armenia Karate Open Championship in 2014, and the first prize in the closed Armenia Karate Championship in 2015. Albert won a gold in Armenia Karate Open Championship in 2016.

The Armenian media has dubbed him "the charming heart-breaker".

External links 

https://alberensso.com
https://soundcloud.com/alberenssomusic

References 

Living people
1999 births
Musicians from Yerevan
Armenian DJs
Armenian record producers